Punisher is the second studio album by American singer-songwriter Phoebe Bridgers, released on June 18, 2020 by Dead Oceans. Bridgers first established herself with her 2017 debut, Stranger in the Alps, a widely acclaimed indie rock effort. In the years preceding her second album, the California native formed the bands boygenius and Better Oblivion Community Center. On Punisher, Bridgers' songwriting is somber and sardonic; deeply personal in nature, it explores topics like dissociation and fragmenting relationships.

Punisher was recorded over a year and a half at Sound City Studios in Los Angeles and reunited Bridgers with producers Tony Berg and Ethan Gruska, who also engineered Alps. Its recording process was collaborative with its liner notes crediting over two dozen prominent musicians, including Julien Baker, Lucy Dacus, Christian Lee Hutson, Jim Keltner, Blake Mills, and Conor Oberst. Punisher was supported by five singles "Garden Song", "Kyoto", "ICU", "I Know the End" and "Savior Complex". Upon its release, the album attracted acclaim from music critics, who celebrated its open lyricism.

Background
American singer-songwriter Phoebe Bridgers rose to prominence in the late 2010s with a blend of subdued and specific songwriting that quickly garnered her a significant level of fame among indie rock fans. Bridgers grew up writing songs and playing guitar; a Los Angeles native, she attended its County High School for the Arts, where she studied vocal jazz. In 2017, she released her debut album, Stranger in the Alps, on Indiana-based indie label Dead Oceans. The LP received widespread acclaim from critics and peers; guitarist John Mayer heralded it as "the arrival of a giant".

She rapidly became an in-demand performer, guesting on songs with the National, Fiona Apple, the 1975, and Jackson Browne. She formed the all-female supergroup boygenius with musicians Julien Baker and Lucy Dacus, which released an EP in 2018. She also began collaborating with Conor Oberst, forming the band Better Oblivion Community Center; it released its debut, self-titled album in 2019. She also began closely working with singer-songwriter Christian Lee Hutson, going on to produce Hutson's debut album, Beginners, released in 2020. Ryan Leas, writing for Stereogum, observed that Bridgers' growing body of work—particularly before releasing a second album—was already "diverse and complex".

Writing and recording

Bridgers first began developing songs for Punisher while on the road touring; many songs predate the release of Alps. Songs such as "ICU" were written at soundchecks. Bridgers considered her efforts on Punisher nothing revolutionary but rather a breakthrough in combining her disparate influences: "how to reference a hundred things at once that I've always loved," she said. She continued to work with drummer Marshall Vore as her closest collaborator, often approaching him first with song ideas. Lyrically, she aimed to imbue each song with an interesting angle, even when it had little to do with her. She reworked lyrics frequently, writing placeholder verses to amuse herself that she ultimately enjoyed too much to replace.

Punisher was recorded at Sound City, a celebrated studio in the L.A. neighborhood of Van Nuys. Bridgers considered its illustrious past "not a big selling point" for her but conceded it to be a "magical place". Punisher hosts a wide array of guest performers, including all of Bridgers' collaborators on her side projects. She noted that many contributors to the album appear because they were simply around Sound City at the time, including veteran percussionist Jim Keltner—known for his work with Bob Dylan and John Lennon—who performs on two tracks, and musician Blake Mills, who adds to three songs on Punisher.

The album was worked on sporadically between mid-2018 and late 2019. To produce Punisher, she recruited Tony Berg and Ethan Gruska, two previous collaborators on Alps. The album came together in a sequential order; many songs were recorded in the order they appear on the album. For the title track, Gruska utilized samples of birds, a Mellotron and a back-masked clip of Bridgers' voice that fade in and out at various points in the song—or as Bridgers puts it, "riding the faders". The technique is one she learned from engineer Joseph Lorge. Bridgers also continued her practice of double tracking all of her vocals as a tribute to her favorite artist, singer-songwriter Elliott Smith. Sonically, the album mixes Bridgers' "arpeggiated guitar work" with "looping synths and eerily groaning strings".

Themes and composition

Punisher has been described as an indie rock, emo-folk, and indie folk album. Lyrically, it tackles themes of "missed connections, the tension between the inner and outer self, [and] the lonely ache of watching things end." In a press release, Bridgers used the words "crying" and the feeling of numbness to describe its contents. Quinn Moreland of Pitchfork interpreted the LP as born from "languid spells of depression, desire, and self-destruction". The album's liner notes dedicate it to Max, a black pug Bridgers had for sixteen years until his passing in 2019. His death had a profound effect on Bridgers, who noted that "going home to an empty apartment was pretty fucked up" and that perhaps it worked its way into the darkness present on Punisher. She also credited the author Joan Didion as an inspiration on Punisher and referenced the podcast My Favorite Murder in two separate articles highlighting her influences on Punisher: "I think it probably snuck in (to the album)," she remarked.

Bridgers' songwriting ranges from sardonic to sharply honest; Lindsay Zoladz of The New York Times observed that Bridgers "weav[es] tiny, specific, time-stamped details (chemtrails, Saltines, serotonin) into durable big-tent tapestries of feeling." Altogether, the album chronicles Bridgers' personal journey towards therapy and being able to better enjoy life. While Alps is rooted in trauma, Punisher identifies tools she used to deal with that trauma.

Songs

The instrumental "DVD Menu" opens the LP and segues into "Garden Song", the album's lead single. "Garden Song" centers on self-manifestation and how one's actions can push things into motion. Bridgers considered it a "sequel" of sorts to "Smoke Signals", the lead single from Alps, in that they are both love songs. Bridgers described "Kyoto" as based around the concept of dissociation—confusion between surroundings and identity, or as Bridgers put it, "living outside your body when cool shit is happening". The song originated from a trip to Japan in which she felt apathetic and unmotivated to explore, and its lyrics are based on her complex relationship with her father. "Kyoto" has been described as one of the catchier songs on the album; its upbeat tone was requested by Berg, who felt she had written too many slow ballads. The title track derives its name from an in-joke among musicians: a punisher is an overzealous fan, one who "lingers at the merch table a little too long". The song examines her longtime love for Elliott Smith, with Bridgers imagining a conversation between them in which she would be the punisher, given her intense devotion to his music. Bridgers thought she might self-title the album but settled on Punisher because it seemed cool.

"Halloween" centers on a decaying relationship that is being clung to until the holidays. The song's development took over a year and a half, with Bridgers struggling with a verse. Conor Oberst, who sings in the song's second half, suggested she write about a conversation topic she brought up frequently: murders that have taken place at L.A.'s Dodger Stadium. "Moon Song" romanticizes a lover who hates themselves. Many commentators singled out the couplet "We hate 'Tears in Heaven'/But it's sad his baby died" as particularly memorable: these lines refer to guitarist Eric Clapton's account of his son's tragic death. She wrote the melody to follow-up song "Savior Complex" in a dream, a folk rock and baroque indie pop waltz, which carries on the subject of a difficult relationship. "ICU"—as in intensive care unit—has been called a "devastating breakup song" and recounts Bridgers' breakup with collaborator Marshall Vore, who remains her touring drummer and confidant. It contains the lyric "I hate your mom/I hate it when she opens her mouth," which stemmed from an altercation Bridgers had with an ex's mother, who argued with her about President Donald Trump while grocery shopping. Bridgers briefly re-titled the song "I See You" upon its debut, so as to remain sensitive to those suffering from COVID-19, but the name was reverted upon the album's release and remains "ICU" on physical editions.

Bridgers penned "Graceland Too"—a country-tinged, lyrical folk, and banjo-led ballad that sonically references her love of bluegrass—on a trip to Nashville to visit her bandmates in boygenius, who later added vocals to the song. The title references a shrine and tourist attraction to Elvis Presley, south of the original Graceland in the U.S. state of Mississippi. To Bridgers, the locale is used as a vehicle and a "cheap" way to express her feelings. "I Know the End" which starts as a folk song, went through several different iterations and was both the first song to be developed and the last to see completion. Bridgers and Vore first developed the song as a depiction of tour-related depression. Its third verse depicts a coastal drive to visit her relatives in northern California where she saw a SpaceX launch that resembled a spaceship. Bridgers sings of passing a highway billboard that reads "the end is near". A chorus of guest vocalists join in and collide in a cacophony of screams.

Release
Punisher was highly anticipated. The album's first single, "Garden Song", was released on February 26, 2020, with its follow-up, "Kyoto", seeing release on April 9 of that year. The album's third single "ICU" (retitled "I See You") was released on May 19, 2020.

The LP was scheduled for release on June 19—or Juneteenth, the official end of slavery in the U.S.—but Bridgers opted to release it early on digital services, with an announcement encouraging fans to donate to organizations seeking racial justice. It debuted during a worldwide quarantine related to the COVID-19 pandemic, and amid a period of civil unrest in the U.S., with citizens protesting the murder of George Floyd and others. "I'm not [delaying] the record until things go back to 'normal' because I don't think they should," Bridgers wrote on Twitter. Touring plans for Punisher were postponed due to the aforementioned pandemic. Bridgers was scheduled to open for The 1975 on a stadium tour. Bridgers announced a headlining tour set for September and October 2021.

Critical reception

Punisher received widespread acclaim from music critics. The album has a score of 90 out of 100 on Metacritic, indicating "universal acclaim", based on 31 reviews.

Pitchforks Sam Sodomsky designated it with the publication's "Best New Music" tag, calling it "marvelous, [...] candid, multi-dimensional, slyly psychedelic, and full of heart. Her music has become a world unto itself." Jonathan Bernstein from Rolling Stone called the work visionary, "eleven expertly rendered, largely downcast songs about broken faith, desperate, occasionally self-destructive love, and tenuous recovery." NME gave the album a perfect score, writing, "The LA songwriter's ability to paint this lingering feeling of dread so vividly is perhaps the biggest factor in her rapid rise to cultish indie household name; just look at the state of the world right now."

David Sackllah of Consequence of Sound gave the album an A−, writing "Punisher beams with a restless energy and twisted dream logic that erupts into striking moments of clarity in a way reminiscent of the National's Boxer. Fred Thomas at AllMusic opined that the LP "reaches new depths [...] It's an album of shockingly self-aware explorations of dark feelings and Bridgers is more willing than ever before to throw herself headlong into the darkness." Alexandra Pollard from The Independent felt that Bridgers "sharpened and broadened her songwriting" on the album; New York Times contributor Lindsay Zoladz designated it as a "critic's pick".

Robert Christgau was less enthusiastic, highlighting the songs "ICU" and "Graceland Too" while summarizing the album's merits with the following statement: "If articulated depression is what you crave, does she have lyrical and musical detail for you—philosophical solace or melodic relief, no".

Accolades

Year-end lists

Awards

Track listing

Personnel 
Credits are adapted from the album's liner notes.

Musicians

 Julien Baker – vocals (10, 11)
 Tony Berg – electric guitar (3, 6, 8, 9), autoharp (3), Syndrum (4), Mellotron (7), bandura (7), banjo (10)
 Phoebe Bridgers – lead vocals, baritone electric guitar (1, 3, 6, 11), "rubber Bridgers" guitar (3, 9), electric guitar (3, 9), fader performance (4), nylon guitar (7), hi strung guitar (8, 10)
 Anna Butterss – bass (9)
 Lucy Dacus – vocals (10, 11)
 Lukas Frank – vocals (11)
 Ethan Gruska – sound design (1, 5–8, 11), programming (2), synthesizers (2, 3, 5, 11), electric guitar (3), acoustic guitar (9), Mellotron (3, 9, 11), piano (4, 5, 7), Pocket Piano (7), vocoder (4), fader performance (4), tenor bass (4), sub-bass (4), bass (6, 7), Optigan flutes (5, 11), sampling (9), pump organ (10)
 Christian Lee Hutson – 12-string guitar (2), baritone electric guitar (5), acoustic guitar (8), celeste (8), vocals (11)
 Jim Keltner – drums (5, 8)
 Jenny Lee Lindberg – bass (3, 9, 11)
 Joseph Lorge – electric guitar (3)
 Malcolm McRae – vocals (11)
 Blake Mills – baritone electric guitar (5), slat drum (5), clarinet (8)
 Rob Moose – strings (1, 4, 6, 8, 11), string arrangement
 Conor Oberst – vocals (5, 11)
 Emily Retsas – bass (11)
 Kane Ritchotte – vocals (11)
 Sebastian Steinberg – upright bass (5, 8), bowed bass (10)
 Tomberlin – vocals (11)
 Marshall Vore – drums (3, 6, 7, 9, 11), percussion (3, 4, 6, 9, 11), vocals (9, 11)
 Jeroen Vrijhoef – vocals (2, 11)
 Nathaniel Walcott – horns (3, 11), horn arrangement
 Sara Watkins – fiddle (10)
 Nick White – piano (11), Mellotron (11)
 Harrison Whitford – electric guitar (3, 6, 7, 9), 12-string acoustic guitar (3), 12-string electric guitar (3), hi strung acoustic guitar (3), acoustic guitar (10)
Nick Zinner – electric guitar (11)

Engineers
 Will Maclellan – engineering
 Joseph Lorge – engineering
 Mike Mogis – mixing
 Bob Ludwig – mastering

Artwork
 Olof Grind – photography
 Chris Riddell – booklet illustrations
 Travis DeMello – booklet layout and design
 Nathaniel David Utesch – layout, design

Charts

Weekly charts

Year-end charts

Certifications

References

2020 albums
Albums produced by Phoebe Bridgers
Phoebe Bridgers albums
Dead Oceans albums
Albums produced by Tony Berg
Albums produced by Mike Mogis